Kent Ambulance Service was the ambulance service for the county of Kent in England until 1 July 2006, when it was succeeded by a South East Coast Ambulance Service also covering Surrey and Sussex.

See also
 Emergency medical services in the United Kingdom

References

Defunct NHS trusts
Health in Kent
Defunct ambulance services in England